Miljana Knežević is a Serbian sprint canoer who has competed since the late 2000s. She won a bronze medal in the K-4 200 m event at the 2007 ICF Canoe Sprint World Championships in Duisburg.

References

Living people
Serbian female canoeists
ICF Canoe Sprint World Championships medalists in kayak
Year of birth missing (living people)